Ancylolomia sansibarica is a moth in the family Crambidae. It was described by Zeller in 1877. It is found in Tanzania, where it has been recorded from Zanzibar.

References

Ancylolomia
Moths described in 1877
Moths of Africa